Éver Arsenio Guzmán Zavala (born 15 March 1988) is a Mexican former footballer who last played as a forward for Guatemalan team Antigua.

Professional
Although having debuted professionally on 15 May 2004 in a game against C.F. Pachuca, Guzmán saw little action with Monarcas until the Clausura 2006 tournament, where he was used consistently by coach Darío Franco. Éver scored his first professional goal in a game against Club Atlas, on 11 February 2006. The goal would prove crucial, as it would put Monarcas in the lead and eventually earn them a draw as Atlas clawed back to tie the game 1–1.

Guzmán played three seasons for San Antonio FC of the USL Championship and left the club as its all-time leading scorer.

In January 2020, Guzmán joined fellow USL Championship side Hartford Athletic. Guzman had five goals in 13 matches for Hartford. in the abbreviated 2020 season. In March 2021, Guzman signed with Antigua GFC of the Liga Nacional de Fútbol de Guatemala.

International
Guzmán is possibly best known for being part of the Mexico national team that won the 2005 U-17 FIFA World Cup. During the tournament, Guzmán was head coach Jesús Ramírez's top reserve, scoring four goals, earning him the distinction of being the second top scorer of the tournament, only below teammate Carlos Vela.

Honours
Morelia
Copa MX: Apertura 2013

Mexico U17
FIFA U-17 World Championship: 2005

References

External links 

 

1988 births
Living people
Atlético Morelia players
C.D. Veracruz footballers
Liga MX players
People from Moroleón
Footballers from Guanajuato
Mexican footballers
Toros Neza footballers
Pan American Games bronze medalists for Mexico
Pan American Games medalists in football
San Antonio FC players
Hartford Athletic players
Association football forwards
Footballers at the 2007 Pan American Games
Expatriate soccer players in the United States
Mexican expatriate footballers
Mexican expatriate sportspeople in the United States
USL Championship players
Medalists at the 2007 Pan American Games